Vester Newcomb (July 14, 1932 – October 6, 2009) was an American football player and coach. He was selected by the Green Bay Packers in the 1956 NFL Draft, but opted instead to continue his playing career at the University of Miami. Newcomb served as the head football coach at the University of Tennessee at Martin from 1978 to 1979, compiling a record of 7–13.

References

1932 births
2009 deaths
American football centers
Miami Hurricanes football coaches
Miami Hurricanes football players
UT Martin Skyhawks football coaches
High school football coaches in South Carolina
People from Calhoun City, Mississippi
Players of American football from Mississippi